Sewed Soles is a compilation album from the rock band The Greenhornes. It was released in November 2005. It consists of old recordings of songs from their previous albums, including their East Grand Blues EP as well as original tracks.

Track listing

Music video
A low budget music video was produced for "There Is An End." The video featured the British singer-songwriter Holly Golightly.

References

External links
 There Is an End music video

The Greenhornes albums
2005 compilation albums
V2 Records compilation albums